Berlin-Chemie AG is a German pharmaceutical company based in Berlin, Germany. It is part of the Menarini Group.

History
Berlin-Chemie considers the establishment of a plant for the laboratory preparations of the Chemical factory of Kahlbaum in Berlin-Adlershof in 1890, as its origin. The first factory located in the former administrative district of Treptow, Berlin-Adlershof. In 1927 after the merger with Schering AG employees began the development of drugs. When the state-owned companies were privatized or dissolved after the political turnaround, the Italian group Menarini took over the factory in Berlin in 1992, including the product name, and thus immediately found a larger sales market in Eastern Europe.

Products 
In February 2013, Berlin-Chemie took over the Priligy brand, a drug against premature ejaculation. Since mid-2013, there has been a media campaign on the internet and through posters on the subject of premature ejaculation, which many physicians are critical of. According to the imprint of the website in question, Later Come.de, this is a media contribution by Berlin-Chemie AG.

Since 2015, Berlin-Chemie has been able to manufacture and sell anti-cancer drugs through a license agreement with the Japanese drug manufacturer Chugai.

The production of infusion solutions was discontinued in 2019.

References

External links
 

Manufacturing companies based in Berlin
Pharmaceutical companies of Germany